Mahayag, officially the Municipality of Mahayag (Subanen: Benwa Mahayag; Chavacano: Municipalidad de Mahayag), is a 3rd class municipality in the province of Zamboanga del Sur, Philippines. According to the 2020 census, it has a population of 48,258 people.

History

The town's name is derived from the Cebuano term "mahayag" (ma = to become + hayag = bright) which means to become bright or sunny. When the Visayan migrants first trickled into the area after World War II, the place was heavily forested, which, to some looks dark and forbidding.  Local historical sources had it that when a large "Dao" tree which stands in the townsite was felt, the place becomes bright, hence the expression "mahayag".

Mahayag used to be the sitio of the barangay Molave in the municipality of Aurora. Early settlers of the area had endeavored for the creation of another municipality to fast-track development which is possible only by having a distinct political subdivision from the municipality of Molave. The town site for the new municipality was donated by Zacarias dela Torre and Pedro Alquizar Sr.

The municipality of Mahayag was officially created on March 9, 1960, pursuant to Executive Order No. 393 by President Carlos P. Garcia, with Saturnino Mendoza as its first appointed and subsequently elected Municipal Mayor. It was formed by the separation of 20 barrios from the municipality of Molave and 3 barrios from the municipality of Dumingag.

Geography

Climate

Barangays
Mahayag is politically subdivided into 29 barangays.

Demographics

Economy

Government

Elected officials
Members of the Mahayag Municipal Council (2019-2022) Municipal officials:
 Mayor Manuel Saladaga
 Vice Mayor Lester Ace S. Espina
 Councilors:
Teomila A. Nobleza
Felipe E. Caylan
Elmer Perez
Apolinar G. Sebandal
Felipe Capadngan
Eduardo B. Borado Jr
Helen M. Maglasang
Antonio Watin

Tourism

The town of Mahayag has a high eco-tourism potential, particularly, the cold springs in Barangay Tuburan, the cave system in Barangay Kaangayan, and the Salug River that traverses the Municipality.

Although the municipality has good eco-tourism potential, to date, only the cold springs in Barangay Tuburan have been developed as evidenced by the three private resorts in the area.  This is the only tourist destination in Mahayag as of this time.

Government investment to promote and to develop eco-tourism remains to be desired.  The cave system in Barangay Kaangayan, for example, due to its proximity to the national highway, can be developed to promote spelunking activities.  On the one hand, studies can be undertaken on the feasibility of promoting whitewater rafting in the rapids of Salug River.

Education

In addition to the daycare centers in each barangay, at least one public elementary school exists in each of the 29 barangays in the municipality.

There are six public high schools and one private high school run by the Catholic Church in the municipality.

Although permitted to operate and offer Collegiate courses since the later part of the 1990s, no tertiary courses had been offered by the Santa Maria Goretti Diocesan School except during the time when it served as an extension campus of the Saint Columban College, Pagadian City.

College students who cannot afford to obtain their education from far places like Ozamiz or Pagadian, may still enroll post secondary classes or TESDA accredited short-term courses at the Pagadian Institute of Technology (PIT) campus in Mahayag, and college degrees like Bachelor in Secondary Education (BSED), Bachelor in Elementary Education (BEED) and Associate in Information Technology (AIT) at Josefina H. Cerilles State College- Mahayag External Studies Unit.

References

External links

 Mahayag Profile at PhilAtlas.com
 [ Philippine Standard Geographic Code]
Philippine Census Information

Municipalities of Zamboanga del Sur
Establishments by Philippine executive order